The Oruanui eruption of New Zealand's Taupō Volcano (also known as the Kawakawa eruption or Kawakawa/Oruanui event) was the world's most recent supereruption.

Eruption

With a Volcanic Explosivity Index of 8, it is one of the largest eruptions ever to occur in New Zealand. The eruption is divided into 10 different phases on the basis of nine mappable fall units and a tenth, poorly preserved but volumetrically dominant fall unit.

A  structural collapse is concealed beneath Lake Taupō, while the lake outline at least partly reflects volcano-tectonic collapse. Early eruption phases saw shifting vent positions; development of the caldera to its maximum extent (indicated by lithic lag breccias) occurred during phase 10.

Unusual features
The Oruanui eruption shows many unusual features: its episodic nature, a wide range of magma-water interaction, and complex interplay of pyroclastic fall and flow deposits. As the eruption occurred through a lake system (Lake Huka) overlying the vent, many of the deposits contain volcanic ash aggregates.

Local impact
Tephra from the eruption covered much of the central North Island and is termed Kawakawa-Oruanui tephra, or KOT. The pyroclastic ignimbrite flows certainly destroyed all vegetation they reached. Later erosion and sedimentation had long-lasting effects on the landscape and may have caused the Waikato River to shift from the Hauraki Plains to its current course through the Waikato to the Tasman Sea. The impact has been summarised as:
A wholly new landscape around the caldera, with ignimbrite accumulations that were landscape-burying up to hundreds of metres thick and ponding in valleys. The actual area of the ignimbrite is less than the subsequent smaller Hatepe eruption presumably because the later generated a more intense pyroclastic flow but much less accumulative tephra fall. 
The area created by the caldera collapse acted both as a sink for sedimentation in the local catchment and as the basin in which a new Lake Taupō accumulated.
The former Lake Huka that had extended to the north and partially occupied the older Reporoa Caldera was destroyed and filled in with ignimbrite, which also  created a temporary barrier between the Taupō and Reporoa watersheds that had to be eroded before a stable drainage of the new Lake Taupō was established.
Cumulative thicknesses of fall deposits and ignimbrite were likely sufficient to have wholly destroyed or buried vegetation over virtually all of the central North Island.
Remobilisation of the vast quantities of pyroclastic material as alluvium produced profound changes in the drainage pattern of the Waikato River, with an impact particularly on the Waikato Plains and Hauraki Plains.

Distal impact
This ash cloud has been modelled to have taken about two weeks to encircle the Southern Hemisphere.

See also 
 North Island Volcanic Plateau
 Taupō volcano
 Hatepe eruption (The most recent major eruption of the Taupō volcano, dated to around 232 CE)

References 

Pre-Holocene volcanism
Pleistocene volcanism
Taupō Volcanic Zone
Supervolcanoes
Events that forced the climate
VEI-8 eruptions
Volcanic eruptions in New Zealand
Plinian eruptions
Lake Taupō